The women's 800 metres at the 2017 World Championships in Athletics was held at the London Olympic Stadium on  and 13 August.

Records
Before the competition records were as follows:

The following records were set at the competition:

Qualification standard
The standard to qualify automatically for entry was 2:01.00.

Schedule
The event schedule, in local time (UTC+1), is as follows:

Results

Heats
The first round took place on 10 August in six heats as follows:

The first three in each heat ( Q ) and the next six fastest ( q ) qualified for the semifinals. The overall results were as follows:

Semifinals
The semifinals took place on 11 August in three heats as follows:

The first two in each heat ( Q ) and the next two fastest ( q ) qualified for the final. The overall results were as follows:

Final
The final took place on 13 August at 20:10. The results were as follows: (photo finish)

References

800
800 metres at the World Athletics Championships